The 2014 Grand Prix de Dottignies was the 13th edition of a one-day women's cycle race held in Dottignies, Belgium on 7 April 2014. The tour has an UCI rating of 1.2.

Results

References

2014 in Belgian sport
2014 in women's road cycling
2014